Paul Whiteman's Goodyear Revue is an American television variety series.  The show aired on ABC on Sunday evenings from November 6, 1949 through March 30, 1952 hosted by Paul Whiteman.

Overview
The show was hosted by band leader Paul Whiteman at the same time as he was also hosting a Saturday talent show called Paul Whiteman's TV Teen Club.  The Goodyear Revue, sponsored by Goodyear, also showcased Junie Keegan from the TV Teen Club.

The show was a typical variety show, with several well-known performers of the time making appearances. Performers who appeared on the show included Risë Stevens, the Vienna Boys' Choir, Victor Borge, Jane Froman, Mel Tormé, Charles Laughton, Mindy Carson, and Peggy Lee.

Singers Earl Wrightson and Maureen Cannon were regulars late in the show's run. In Summer 1951, Wrightson and Cannon took over hosting duties while Whiteman was on vacation during, and renamed The Goodyear Summertime Revue.

Production
Ward Byron and William H. Brown Jr. were the producers, and Brown was the director. Pembroke Davenport was the choral director. The program originated at WJZ-TV in New York City.

References

External links
 

1949 American television series debuts
1952 American television series endings
1940s American variety television series
1950s American variety television series
American Broadcasting Company original programming
Black-and-white American television shows
English-language television shows
Goodyear Tire and Rubber Company